The Collector is an Andreas Johnson compilation album, released on 7 March 2007.

Track listing
Go for the Soul - 3:44
A Little Bit of Love - 3:08
Glorious - 3:27
Sing for Me - 3:04
Show Me Love - 4:02
The Games We Play - 3:49
Do What You Want - 3:23
People - 4:11
Shine - 3:42
Seven Days - 2:55
Crush - 3:32
End of the World - 4:15
Waterfall - 4:19
Pretty Ones - 3:13
Superficial - 4:03
Still My World - 3:11

Charts

Weekly charts

Year-end charts

References

External links

2007 compilation albums
Andreas Johnson albums
Compilation albums by Swedish artists